"I Almost Told You That I Loved You" is the third single from Californian rock band Papa Roach's fifth album, Metamorphosis, and twelfth released single in total.

Music video

The video is set in a brothel filled with strippers with the band playing in the middle of it. The scenes flick off in many places to acts of sexual intercourse. There are three versions of the video: the one for public viewing (without Jacoby Shaddix being whipped by his wife), the censored and uncensored version. In the end of the video a girl kisses another girl trying to escape and drops a ring that on the inside says I Love You.

Track listing

Chart performance

References

2008 songs
2009 singles
Papa Roach songs
Interscope Records singles
Songs written by Tobin Esperance
Songs written by Jacoby Shaddix
Songs written by James Michael
DGC Records singles
American hard rock songs